The Type 65 is a torpedo manufactured in the Soviet Union/Russia. It was developed for use against US Navy aircraft carrier battle groups, as well as large merchant targets such as supertankers and advanced enemy submarines. It is now typically fitted to newer Russian vessels, though often the 650 mm torpedo tube is fitted with a 533 mm converter to enable firing of SS-N-15 missiles or Type 53 torpedoes.

Russian officials have stated that a 65-76A modification of this torpedo is responsible for the 12 August 2000 explosion of the Russian submarine Kursk.

Specifications (65-76)
Diameter: 65 cm (25.6 in)
Length: 9.14 m (30 ft)
Range: 50 km at 93 km/h, 100 km at 56 km/h
Max Speed: 50 knots (93 km/h)
Homing: active/passive sonar and wire guidance
Warhead: 450/557 kg high explosive
Propulsion: Probably gas-turbine powered by hydrogen peroxide, kerosene and compressed air fuel. Driving contra-rotating propellers.

Variants
 65-73 Entered service 1973, unguided torpedo.  20 kt Nuclear.
 65-76 Kit (Whale) Entered service 1976.
 DT Length 11 m. Weight 4,500 kg. Warhead 450 kg.
 DST92  Length 11 m. Weight 4,750 kg. Warhead 557 kg. Wake homing anti-ship weapon. Operates at 20 m depth. Sensor points upwards to detect the ship's wake, the torpedo sweeps from side to side to find the edges of the wake.
 65-76A Kit 100 km. Entered service 1991.

References

Torpedoes of Russia
Cold War weapons of the Soviet Union
Military equipment introduced in the 1970s